Endo-1,3-beta-glucanase may refer to:

 Endo-1,3(4)-b-glucanase, an enzyme
 Glucan endo-1,3-b-D-glucosidase, an enzyme